Félix Jules Méline (20 May 183821 December 1925) was a French statesman, Prime Minister of France from 1896 to 1898.

Biography
Méline was born at Remiremont.  Having taken up law as his profession, he was chosen a deputy in 1872, and in 1879 he was for a short time Under-Secretary to the Minister of the Interior. In 1880 he came to the front as the leading spokesman of the party which favoured the protection of French industries, and he had a considerable share in fashioning the protectionist legislation of the years 1890–1902. From 1883 to 1885 Méline was Minister for Agriculture, and in 1888–1889 he was President of the Chamber of Deputies. In 1896 he became Premier (Président du Conseil) and Minister for Agriculture, offices which he vacated in 1898.

At one time he edited La République francaise, and after his retirement from public life he wrote Le Retour de la terre et Ia surproduction industrielle, tout en faveur de l'agriculture (1905).

The introduction of French protectionist measure of 1892 is named after him, the Méline tariff.

Méline's Ministry
Méline's Ministry, 29 April 1896 – 28 June 1898:
Jules Méline – President of the Council and Minister of Agriculture
Gabriel Hanotaux – Minister of Foreign Affairs
Jean-Baptiste Billot – Minister of War
Louis Barthou – Minister of the Interior
Georges Cochery – Minister of Finance
Jean-Baptiste Darlan – Minister of Justice
Armand Louis Charles Gustave Besnard – Minister of Marine
Alfred Rambaud – Minister of Public Instruction, Fine Arts, and Worship
André Lebon – Minister of Colonies
Adolphe Turrel – Minister of Public Works
Henry Boucher – Minister of Commerce, Industry, Posts, and Telegraphs

Changes
26 September 1896 – Jean-Baptiste Darlan succeeds Rambaud as Minister of Worship, remaining also Minister of Justice.  Rambaud remains Minister of Public Instruction and Fine Arts.
1 December 1897 – Victor Milliard succeeds Darlan as Minister of Justice and Worship.
31 May 1898 – Gabriel Hanotaux succeeds Lebon as interim Minister of Colonies, remaining also Minister of Foreign Affairs.

Notes

References

External links
 

1838 births
1925 deaths
People from Remiremont
Politicians from Grand Est
Progressive Republicans (France)
Republican Federation politicians
Prime Ministers of France
French Ministers of Agriculture
Members of the National Assembly (1871)
Presidents of the Chamber of Deputies (France)
Members of the 1st Chamber of Deputies of the French Third Republic
Members of the 2nd Chamber of Deputies of the French Third Republic
Members of the 3rd Chamber of Deputies of the French Third Republic
Members of the 4th Chamber of Deputies of the French Third Republic
Members of the 5th Chamber of Deputies of the French Third Republic
Members of the 6th Chamber of Deputies of the French Third Republic
Members of the 7th Chamber of Deputies of the French Third Republic
Members of the 8th Chamber of Deputies of the French Third Republic
French Senators of the Third Republic
Senators of Vosges (department)